The Elusive Avengers (translit. Neulovimye mstiteli) is a 1967 Soviet adventure film directed by Edmond Keosayan and made by Mosfilm. It is loosely based on the novel Red Devils by Pavel Blyakhin, already filmed in 1923 under its original name. The film is an example of Ostern, set in Russian Civil War era Ukraine.

The film has spawned two sequels, The New Adventures of the Elusive Avengers (1968) and The Crown of the Russian Empire, or Once Again the Elusive Avengers (1971).

Synopsis
The film is a version of a story about four youngsters who become heroes in the Russian Civil War. Danka, orphaned son of a Red agent, whose father was tortured and executed by the warlord Lyuty before his eyes, and his sister Ksanka join Valerka, a former schoolboy, and Yashka, a devil-may-care gypsy. They make a pledge of mutual assistance, determined to exact revenge on the bandits who are bringing so much suffering to peaceful villagers. The friends then embark on a series of daring adventures.

Meanwhile, strange things begin to happen to a band of outlaws led by the ruthless bandit Ataman Burnash. All his schemes seem to go wrong, sabotaged by unseen and unidentified enemies. The mischievous culprits always leave a note signed '- the Elusive Avengers', and are of course the four friends, who succeed by never forgetting their pledge of mutual assistance. They are so effective, in fact, that reports of their deeds are reaching the local division of the Red Army.

In a plot twist familiar to many Westerns such as For a Few Dollars More and the Japanese Yojimbo, Danka uses his anonymity to infiltrate the outlaws' gang and insinuate himself into Burnash's confidence, becoming his trusted right hand man. Unfortunately, Warlord Lyuty, whom Danka had thought he killed earlier, arrives at the Ataman's camp and accuses Danka; and when Lyuty's accusations are proven, it is up to the other three Avengers to get him out.

At the end of the movie, the Avengers are honored and acknowledged by the Red Army, which promptly appropriates the four of them as soldiers. The Elusive Avengers ride off into the rising sun, ready to answer their army's call.

Cast
 Viktor Kosykh – Danka Shchus
 Valentina Kurdyukova – Ksanka Shchus
 Vasily Vasilyev – Yashka the Gypsy
 Mikhail Metyolkin – Valerka Meshcheryakov
 Yefim Kopelyan – chieftain Ignat Burnash
 Vladimir Treshchalov – chieftain Sidor Lyuty (voiced by Yevgeny Vesnik)
 Boris Sichkin – Buba Kastorsky, actor and singer
 Lev Sverdlin – Semyon Budyonny
 Vladimir Belokurov – bandit, named "holy father-philosopher"
 Gennadi Yukhtin – Ignat, bandit, Sidor Lyuty's helper
 Inna Churikova – Blond Josy, singer
 Gleb Strizhenov – father Mokiy
 Savely Kramarov – Ilyukha Verekhov, cross-eyed bandit

Differences from the original
 In the book, the "ethnic minority" character was Chinese circus acrobat Yu-Yu. The 1923 adaptation replaced him with a black boy, Tom Jackson, a move very popular in early Soviet cinema to display Soviet internationalism (compare Circus or Flight to the Moon). The Elusive Avengers, filmed in Cold War era, by contrast, avoided references to the United States and replaced the obviously propagandistic black Tom with the more realistic gypsy Yashka.

References

External links

1967 films
Mosfilm films
Russian historical adventure films
Soviet historical adventure films
Ostern films
1960s Russian-language films
1960s action comedy films
Soviet action comedy films
Films directed by Edmond Keosayan
Films set in Ukraine
Films shot in Ukraine
1967 comedy films
Russian films about revenge
Russian vigilante films
Soviet war films
Russian Civil War films
Soviet teen films